The Ellis Park Stadium disaster was a crowd crush that occurred on 11 April 2001, claiming the lives of 43 people. Surpassing the Oppenheimer Stadium disaster, it became the worst sporting accident in South African history. Spectators poured into the Ellis Park Stadium in the city of Johannesburg, Gauteng, South Africa, for the local Soweto derby association football match between Kaizer Chiefs and Orlando Pirates. There was a 60,000 capacity crowd in the stadium, but reports suggest a further 30,000 more fans were trying to gain entry to the stadium. Reports also suggest that 120,000 fans were admitted into the stadium. An Orlando Pirates equaliser sparked a further surge by the fans trying to gain entry as they scrambled to see what had happened. The match was stopped after approximately 34 minutes of play when authorities received an unusually high volume of reported injuries.

Incident
As the crowd surged to gain seats and see the pitch, they overspilled into press boxes, and 43 people were crushed to death. Apparently untrained security guards firing tear gas at the stampeding fans exacerbated the situation, and may have been the cause of some of the deaths. The South African Police Services denied these claims. The final inquiry into the incident concluded that a major cause was bribed security personnel admitting fans without tickets into the stadium and poor crowd control.

When it became apparent what had happened, the match was halted and the crowd was dispersed. The bodies were laid out on the pitch for identification and medical attention, but none were revived. This was the worst sporting accident in South African history, surpassing the Oppenheimer Stadium disaster in 1991. This mirrored the Ellis Park Stadium disaster as it involved the same two teams.

See also 

 Crowd collapses and crushes

References

External links
 
South African press
BBC coverage

Sport in Johannesburg
Human stampedes in 2001
Stadium disasters
Man-made disasters in South Africa
Soccer in South Africa
Kaizer Chiefs F.C.
Orlando Pirates F.C.
Sport
2000–01 in South African soccer
Association football controversies
21st century in Johannesburg
April 2001 events in Africa
2001 disasters in South Africa